Mary Bastian  (1948 – 6 January 1985) was a Sri Lankan Tamil human rights activist and Catholic priest. He was shot and killed along with 10 other civilians on January 6, 1985, during the Sri Lankan Civil War, allegedly by the Sri Lankan Army.

Biography
Mary Bastian born in Ilavalai in Jaffna district was ordained as a priest in the year 1975. He served as parish priest first at Manipay and later in Murunkan and Madhu in Mannar district.

Background
During military offensives by the Sri Lankan Army in 1984 as part of the ongoing Sri Lankan civil war in Mannar region, Bastian and George Jeyarajasingham became the focal point of Human Rights activism on behalf of the local people. He was also the local contact for the Sri Lankan government appointed presidential committee to investigate Human Rights violations in the Mannar district. Jeyarajasingham of the Methodist Church was shot dead on December 13, 1984, when he was traveling in his vehicle.  Later his body was burnt along with his vehicle. Bastian had collected the remains of victims including Jeyarajasingham and handed them to the Jeevothayam Methodist Centre.

Incident
On 6 January 1985, Bastian along with 10 others were shot allegedly by the Sri Lankan Army personnel, point blank range in front of the local St. Anne's church.

Reactions

Sri Lankan Government
The National Security Minister denied that his forces had killed Bastian. The spokesperson was quoted as saying

On January 9, the government owned Daily News reported that, according to the Minister of National Security Lalith Athulathmudali, Bastian's body had not been found and arms and ammunition were found in the church, which the government alleged was used as a terrorist base. The minister was quoted as saying that the police had spied on Bastian getting into a boat and going across to India.

Later in a report to the United Nations, the Sri Lankan government claimed that the body of Bastian was found but the state was not involved in his murder.

Catholic Church
In a statement, reported in the Sun on January 8, Marcus Fernando, then Bishop of Chillaw and the president of the Catholic Bishops' Conference of Sri Lanka, said that reports reaching the Catholic Bishops' Conference indicated that the shooting was an unprovoked Sri Lankan Army attack on the church and the incumbent.

On January 8, Thomas Savundranayagam, the then Bishop of Mannar, in a statement to the strongly protested the insinuation by the government that arms were found in the church and he also accused the military of complicity in the murder of Father Mary Bastian.

He was quoted as saying

Amnesty International
Amnesty International, the London human rights watchdog, in its report stated,

Memorial
The people of Vankalai later erected a statue of Mary Bastian in the compound of St Anne's Church in his memory.

See also
George Jeyarajasingham
Chandra Fernando
Nihal Jim Brown
Mariampillai Sarathjeevan
Eugene John Hebert

Notes
 The author of Speaking truth to power: the human rights situation in Sri Lanka,  Fr. Pancras Jordan is an Australian Roman Catholic priest and is a member of Pax Christi, a non-profit, non-governmental Catholic peace movement working on a global scale on a wide variety of issues in the fields of human rights, security and peace.
The author of Sri Lanka: Untold Story, K.T. Rajasingham is a senior journalist from Sri Lanka

References

External links
Another family wiped out in Vankalai

1948 births
1985 deaths
Sri Lankan Tamil priests
Minority rights activists
Assassinated Sri Lankan activists
Deaths by firearm in Sri Lanka
20th-century Sri Lankan Roman Catholic priests
People murdered in Sri Lanka
20th-century Roman Catholic martyrs